Polsinelli is an AmLaw 100 firm with more than 1,000 attorneys in 23 offices nationwide.

History

Polsinelli is an Am Law 100 firm with more than 1,000 attorneys in 22 offices nationwide. The firm’s attorneys focus on health care, finance, real estate, technology, private equity and life sciences.

Polsinelli was founded in 1972 by Jim Polsinelli and two other young attorneys in a small office to serve business and real estate clients in the historic Country Club District in Kansas City, Missouri.

Throughout the 1980s, Polsinelli represented small businesses and entrepreneurs.

In the mid-1980s, the firm expanded its trial practice by adding a national products liability practice.

In 2000, Polsinelli created a Science and Technology group with patent and business attorneys focused on the emerging biotech industry.

With its June 2004 merger with Suelthaus, PC, a 35-lawyer St. Louis-based entrepreneurial business law firm founded in 1929, the firm doubled the size of its St. Louis office. In July 2005, the firm opened offices in Washington, D.C. and New York.

In January 2006, Nasharr & Shea LLC, a small banking and real estate firm, merged into the firm, giving Polsinelli an office in Chicago.

On February 1, 2009, the 300-attorney Polsinelli firm merged with Shughart Thomson & Kilroy, P.C., a 180-lawyer Kansas City-based, regional law firm with a national trial reputation and a business practice

July 1, 2011, Polsinelli expanded into California via its acquisition of the attorneys and staff of Quateman LLP, California’s largest women-owned bond counsel firm founded in 1989 by Lisa Greer Quateman.

In March 2016, Polsinelli welcomed 44 intellectual property attorneys led by Gregory Novak and Tracy Druce, including Q. Todd Dickinson, from the national boutique firm Novak Druce Connolly Bove + Quigg., forming one of the largest IP practices in the nation and opening offices in Houston, Boston and Silicon Valley. Since 2012, the firm has also opened offices in San Francisco, Seattle and Miami.

Notable cases
Reichle v. Howards - Case decided by the Supreme Court 8-0 in 2012 in which Secret Service detail of Dick Cheney had not infringed on protestor's free speech rights when they arrested him.
Coach America bankruptcy and restructuring.

Offices
Polsinelli is headquartered in Plaza Vista on the Country Club Plaza. Prior to that, the firm was headquartered in the Country Club Plaza in the Plaza Steppes building starting in 1991. Earlier it had been located in the Plaza Theatre building in the Plaza. Its attempts to move to a new headquarters in recent years have met with some controversy. In 2010 it proposed moving into a new 8-story glass tower at 47th and Broadway on the east side of the Plaza. That structure would have involved tearing down a vintage 1920s Plaza building in the Plaza's traditional low-rise Spanish style and replacing it with a glass highrise. The plan was eventually withdrawn after considerable protests.

In 2012, it announced plans to tear down the bankrupt and unfinished Moshe Safdie-designed West Edge building that had originally been built for Bob Bernstein on the west side of the Plaza and replace it with a 10-story structure designed by 360 Architecture called Plaza Vista. On February 12, 2013, a natural gas explosion in the gas line leading into JJ's Restaurant across the street from the project leveled the restaurant and heavily damaged the Plaza Vista's glass curtain wall. The Plaza Vista's roof also had to be replaced because of embers. Despite setbacks, contractors were able to finish the project and the firm was able to move into their new headquarters on November 1, 2013.

References

Law firms established in 1972
1972 establishments in Missouri
Law firms based in Kansas City, Missouri